Rogue waves (also known as freak waves, monster waves, episodic waves, killer waves, extreme waves, and abnormal waves) are unusually large, unpredictable, and suddenly appearing surface waves that can be extremely dangerous to ships, even to large ones. They are distinct from tsunamis, which are often almost unnoticeable in deep waters and are caused by the displacement of water due to other phenomena (such as earthquakes). A rogue wave appearing at the shore is sometimes referred to as a sneaker wave.

In oceanography, rogue waves are more precisely defined as waves whose height is more than twice the significant wave height (H or SWH), which is itself defined as the mean of the largest third of waves in a wave record. Therefore, rogue waves are not necessarily the biggest waves found on the water; they are, rather, unusually large waves for a given sea state. Rogue waves seem not to have a single distinct cause, but occur where physical factors such as high winds and strong currents cause waves to merge to create a single exceptionally large wave.

A 2012 study supported the existence of oceanic rogue holes, the inverse of rogue waves, where the depth of the hole can reach more than twice the significant wave height. Rogue holes have been replicated in experiments using water-wave tanks, but have not been confirmed in the real world.

Background 

Rogue waves are open-water phenomena, in which winds, currents, nonlinear phenomena such as solitons, and other circumstances cause a wave to briefly form that is far larger than the "average" large wave (the significant wave height or "SWH") of that time and place. The basic underlying physics that makes phenomena such as rogue waves possible is that different waves can travel at different speeds, so they can "pile up" in certain circumstances, known as "constructive interference". (In deep ocean, the speed of a gravity wave is proportional to the square root of its wavelength, the peak-to-peak distance between adjacent waves.) However, other situations can also give rise to rogue waves, particularly situations where nonlinear effects or instability effects can cause energy to move between waves and be concentrated in one or very few extremely large waves before returning to "normal" conditions.

Once considered mythical and lacking hard evidence for their existence, rogue waves are now proven to exist and known to be natural ocean phenomena. Eyewitness accounts from mariners and damage inflicted on ships have long suggested that they occur, but the first scientific evidence of their existence came with the recording of a rogue wave by the Gorm platform in the central North Sea in 1984. During that event, minor damage was inflicted on the platform far above sea level, confirming the validity of the reading made by a downwards pointing laser sensor.

Their existence has also since been confirmed by video and photographs, satellite imagery, radar of the ocean surface, stereo wave imaging systems, pressure transducers on the sea-floor, and oceanographic research vessels. "In 2004 scientists using three weeks of radar images from European Space Agency satellites found ten rogue waves, each  or higher."

A rogue wave is a natural ocean phenomenon that is not caused by land movement, only lasts briefly, occurs in a limited location, and most often happens far out at sea. Rogue waves are considered rare, but potentially very dangerous, since they can involve the spontaneous formation of massive waves far beyond the usual expectations of ship designers, and can overwhelm the usual capabilities of ocean-going vessels which are not designed for such encounters. Rogue waves are, therefore, distinct from tsunamis. Tsunamis are caused by a massive displacement of water, often resulting from sudden movements of the ocean floor, after which they propagate at high speed over a wide area. They are nearly unnoticeable in deep water and only become dangerous as they approach the shoreline and the ocean floor becomes shallower; therefore, tsunamis do not present a threat to shipping at sea (e.g., the only ships lost in the 2004 Asian tsunami were in port.). They are also distinct from megatsunamis, which are single massive waves caused by sudden impact, such as meteor impact or landslides within enclosed or limited bodies of water. They are also different from the waves described as "hundred-year waves", which are a purely statistical prediction of the highest wave likely to occur in a 100-year period in a particular body of water.

Rogue waves have now been proven to be the cause of the sudden loss of some ocean-going vessels. Well-documented instances include the freighter MS München, lost in 1978. Rogue waves have been implicated in the loss of other vessels, including the Ocean Ranger, a semisubmersible mobile offshore drilling unit that sank in Canadian waters on 15 February 1982. In 2007, the United States' National Oceanic and Atmospheric Administration  compiled a catalogue of more than 50 historical incidents probably associated with rogue waves.

History of rogue wave knowledge

Early reports 

In that era, the thought was widely held that no wave could exceed . Author Susan Casey wrote that much of that disbelief came because there were very few people who had seen a rogue wave and survived; until the advent of steel double-hulled ships of the 20th century "people who encountered  rogue waves generally weren't coming back to tell people about it."

Pre-1995 research 

Unusual waves have been studied scientifically for many years (for example, John Scott Russell's wave of translation, an 1834 study of a soliton wave), but these were not linked conceptually to sailors' stories of encounters with giant rogue ocean waves, as the latter were believed to be scientifically implausible.

Since the 19th century, oceanographers, meteorologists, engineers, and ship designers have used a statistical model known as the Gaussian function (or Gaussian Sea or standard linear model) to predict wave height, on the assumption that wave heights in any given sea are tightly grouped around a central value equal to the average of the largest third, known as the significant wave height (SWH). It suggests one of  could indeed happen, but only once in 10,000 years. This basic assumption was well accepted, though acknowledged to be an approximation. The use of a Gaussian form to model waves had been the sole basis of virtually every text on that topic for the past 100 years.

The first known scientific article on "freak waves" was written by Professor Laurence Draper in 1964. Draper also described freak wave holes.

Even as late as the mid-1990s, though, most popular texts on oceanography such as that by Pirie did not contain any mention of rogue or freak waves. Even after the 1995 Draupner wave, the popular text on Oceanography by Gross (1996) only gave rogue waves a mention and simply stated, "Under extraordinary circumstances, unusually large waves called rogue waves can form" without providing any further detail.

The 1995 Draupner wave 

The Draupner wave (or New Year's wave) was the first rogue wave to be detected by a measuring instrument.

The reading was confirmed by the other sensors. The platform sustained minor damage in the event.

The wave caused enormous interest in the scientific community.

Subsequent research 

Following the evidence of the Draupner wave, research in the area became widespread.

The first scientific study to comprehensively prove that freak waves exist, which are clearly outside the range of Gaussian waves, was published in 1997. Some research confirms that observed wave height distribution in general follows well the Rayleigh distribution, but in shallow waters during high energy events, extremely high waves are rarer than this particular model predicts. From about 1997 most leading authors acknowledged the existence of rogue waves with the caveat that wave models had been unable to replicate rogue waves.

Statoil researchers presented a paper in 2000, collating evidence that freak waves were not the rare realizations of a typical or slightly non-gaussian sea surface population (classical extreme waves), but rather they were the typical realizations of a rare and strongly non-gaussian sea surface population of waves (freak extreme waves). A workshop of leading researchers in the world attended the first Rogue Waves 2000 workshop held in Brest in November 2000.

In 2000, British oceanographic vessel RRS Discovery recorded a  wave off the coast of Scotland near Rockall. This was a scientific research vessel fitted with high-quality instruments. These were some of the largest waves recorded by scientific instruments up to that time. The authors noted that modern wave prediction models are known to significantly under-predict extreme sea states for waves with a significant height (Hs) above . The analysis of this event took a number of years, and noted that "none of the state-of-the-art weather forecasts and wave models – the information upon which all ships, oil rigs, fisheries, and passenger boats rely – had predicted these behemoths." Put simply, a scientific model (and also ship design method) to describe the waves encountered did not exist. This finding was widely reported in the press, which reported that "according to all of the theoretical models at the time under this particular set of weather conditions, waves of this size should not have existed".

In 2004, the ESA MaxWave project identified more than 10 individual giant waves above  in height during a short survey period of three weeks in a limited area of the South Atlantic. The ESA's ERS satellites have helped to establish the widespread existence of these "rogue" waves. By 2007, it was further proven via satellite radar studies that waves with crest-to-trough heights of  occur far more frequently than previously thought. Rogue waves are now known to occur in all of the world's oceans many times each day.

Rogue waves are now accepted as a common phenomenon. Professor Akhmediev of the Australian National University has stated that 10 rogue waves exist in the world's oceans at any moment. Some researchers have speculated that roughly three of every 10,000 waves on the oceans achieve rogue status, yet in certain spots – such as coastal inlets and river mouths – these extreme waves can make up three of every 1,000 waves, because wave energy can be focused.

Rogue waves may also occur in lakes. A phenomenon known as the "Three Sisters" is said to occur in Lake Superior when a series of three large waves forms. The second wave hits the ship's deck before the first wave clears. The third incoming wave adds to the two accumulated backwashes and suddenly overloads the ship deck with tons of water.

Serious studies of the phenomenon of rogue waves only started after the 1995 Draupner wave and have intensified since about 2005. One of the remarkable features of the rogue waves is that they always appear from nowhere and quickly disappear without a trace. Recent research has suggested that "super-rogue waves", which are up to five times the average sea state, could also exist. "Rogue wave" has now become a near-universal term used by scientists to describe isolated, large-amplitude waves that occur more frequently than expected for normal, Gaussian-distributed, statistical events. Rogue waves appear to be ubiquitous in nature and are not limited to the oceans. They appear in other contexts and recently have been reported in liquid helium, in nonlinear optics, and in microwave cavities. Marine researchers universally now accept that these waves belong to a specific kind of sea wave, not taken into account by conventional models for sea wind waves.

In 2012, researchers at the Australian National University proved the existence of "rogue wave holes", an inverted profile of a rogue wave. Their research created rogue wave holes on the water surface, in a water-wave tank. In maritime folklore, stories of rogue holes are as common as stories of rogue waves. They follow from theoretical analysis, but had never been proven experimentally.

A 2015 paper studied the wave behavior around a rogue wave, including optical, and the Draupner wave, and concluded, "rogue events do not necessarily appear without a warning, but are often preceded by a short phase of relative order".

In 2019, researchers succeeded in producing a wave with similar characteristics to the Draupner wave (steepness and breaking), and proportionately greater height, using multiple wavetrains meeting at an angle of 120°. Previous research had strongly suggested that the wave resulted from an interaction between waves from different directions ("crossing seas"). Their research also highlighted that wave-breaking behavior was not necessarily as expected. If waves met at an angle less than about 60°, then the top of the wave "broke" sideways and downwards (a "plunging breaker"), but from about 60° and greater, the wave began to break vertically upwards, creating a peak that did not reduce the wave height as usual, but instead increased it (a "vertical jet"). They also showed that the steepness of rogue waves could be reproduced in this manner. They concluded, "... the onset and type of wave breaking play a significant role and differ significantly for crossing and noncrossing waves. Crucially, breaking becomes less crest-amplitude limiting for sufficiently large crossing angles and involves the formation of near-vertical jets".

Research efforts 

A number of research programmes are currently underway focused on rogue waves, including:
 In the course of Project MaxWave, researchers from the GKSS Research Centre, using data collected by ESA satellites, identified a large number of radar signatures that have been portrayed as evidence for rogue waves. Further research is underway to develop better methods of translating the radar echoes into sea surface elevation, but at present this technique is not proven.
 The Australian National University, working in collaboration with Hamburg University of Technology and the University of Turin, have been conducting experiments in nonlinear dynamics to try to explain so-called rogue or killer waves. The "Lego Pirate" video has been widely used and quoted to describe what they call "super rogue waves", which their research suggests can be up to five times bigger than the other waves around them.
 The European Space Agency continues to do research into rogue waves by radar satellite.
 United States Naval Research Laboratory, the science arm of the Navy and Marine Corps published results of their modelling work in 2015.
 Massachusetts Institute of Technology research in this field is ongoing. Two researchers there partially supported by the Naval Engineering Education Consortium  have considered the problem of short-term prediction of rare, extreme water waves and have developed and published their research on an effective predictive tool of about 25 wave periods. This tool can give ships and their crews a two- to three-minute warning of potentially catastrophic impact allowing crew some time to shut down essential operations on a ship (or offshore platform). The authors cite landing on an aircraft carrier as a prime example.
 The University of Colorado and the University of Stellenbosch
 Kyoto University
 Swinburne University of Technology in Australia recently published work on the probabilities of rogue waves.
 The University of Oxford Department of Engineering Science published a comprehensive review of the science of rogue waves in 2014. In 2019, A team from the Universities of Oxford and Edinburgh recreated the Draupner wave in a lab.
 University of Western Australia
 Tallinn University of Technology in Estonia
 Extreme Seas Project funded by the EU.
 At Umeå University in Sweden, a research group in August 2006 showed that normal stochastic wind-driven waves can suddenly give rise to monster waves. The nonlinear evolution of the instabilities was investigated by means of direct simulations of the time-dependent system of nonlinear equations.
 The Great Lakes Environmental Research Laboratory did research in 2002, which dispelled the long-held contentions that rogue waves were of rare occurrence.
 The University of Oslo has conducted research into crossing sea state and rogue wave probability during the Prestige accident; nonlinear wind-waves, their modification by tidal currents, and application to Norwegian coastal waters; general analysis of realistic ocean waves; modelling of currents and waves for sea structures and extreme wave events; rapid computations of steep surface waves in three dimensions, and comparison with experiments; and very large internal waves in the ocean.
 The National Oceanography Centre in the United Kingdom
 Scripps Institute of Oceanography in the United States
 Ritmare project in Italy.

Causes

Because the phenomenon of rogue waves is still a matter of active research,  stating clearly what the most common causes are or whether they vary from place to place is premature. The areas of highest predictable risk appear to be where a strong current runs counter to the primary direction of travel of the waves; the area near Cape Agulhas off the southern tip of Africa is one such area. The warm Agulhas Current runs to the southwest, while the dominant winds are westerlies, but since this thesis does not explain the existence of all waves that have been detected, several different mechanisms are likely, with localized variation. Suggested mechanisms for freak waves include:

Diffractive focusing According to this hypothesis, coast shape or seabed shape directs several small waves to meet in phase. Their crest heights combine to create a freak wave.

Focusing by currents Waves from one current are driven into an opposing current. This results in shortening of wavelength, causing shoaling (i.e., increase in wave height), and oncoming wave trains to compress together into a rogue wave. This happens off the South African coast, where the Agulhas Current is countered by westerlies.

Nonlinear effects (modulational instability)Possibly, a rogue wave may occur by natural, nonlinear processes from a random background of smaller waves. In such a case, it is hypothesized, an unusual, unstable wave type may form, which "sucks" energy from other waves, growing to a near-vertical monster itself, before becoming too unstable and collapsing shortly thereafter. One simple model for this is a wave equation known as the nonlinear Schrödinger equation (NLS), in which a normal and perfectly accountable (by the standard linear model) wave begins to "soak" energy from the waves immediately fore and aft, reducing them to minor ripples compared to other waves. The NLS can be used in deep-water conditions. In shallow water, waves are described by the Korteweg–de Vries equation or the Boussinesq equation. These equations also have nonlinear contributions and show solitary-wave solutions. A small-scale rogue wave consistent with the NLS on (the Peregrine soliton) was produced in a laboratory water tank in 2011. In particular, the study of solitons, and especially Peregrine solitons, have supported the idea that nonlinear effects could arise in bodies of water.

Normal part of the wave spectrum Some studies argue that many waves classified as rogue waves (with the sole condition that they exceed twice the SWH) are not freaks, but just rare, random samples of the wave height distribution, and are, as such, statistically expected to occur at a rate of about one rogue wave every 28 hours. This is commonly discussed as the question "Freak Waves: Rare Realizations of a Typical Population Or Typical Realizations of a Rare Population?" According to this hypothesis, most real-world encounters with unusually large waves can be explained by linear wave theory (or weakly nonlinear modifications thereof), without the need for special mechanisms like the modulational instability. Recent studies analyzing billions of wave measurements by wave buoys demonstrate that rogue wave occurrence rates in the ocean can be explained with linear theory when the finite spectral bandwidth of the wave spectrum is taken into account. However, Whether weakly nonlinear dynamics can explain even the largest rogue waves (such as those exceeding three times the significant wave height, which would be exceedingly rare in linear theory) is not yet known. This has also led to some criticism questioning whether defining rogue waves using only their relative height is meaningful in practice.
Constructive interference of elementary waves Rogue waves can result from the constructive interference (dispersive and directional focusing) of elementary three-dimensional waves enhanced by nonlinear effects.
Wind wave interactions While wind alone is unlikely to generate a rogue wave, its effect combined with other mechanisms may provide a fuller explanation of freak wave phenomena. As wind blows over the ocean, energy is transferred to the sea surface. When strong winds from a storm happen to blow in the opposing direction of the ocean current, the forces might be strong enough to randomly generate rogue waves. Theories of instability mechanisms for the generation and growth of wind waves – although not on the causes of rogue waves – are provided by Phillips and Miles.

The spatiotemporal focusing seen in the NLS equation can also occur when the nonlinearity is removed. In this case, focusing is primarily due to different waves coming into phase, rather than any energy-transfer processes. Further analysis of rogue waves using a fully nonlinear model by R. H. Gibbs (2005) brings this mode into question, as it is shown that a typical wave group focuses in such a way as to produce a significant wall of water, at the cost of a reduced height.

A rogue wave, and the deep trough commonly seen before and after it, may last only for some minutes before either breaking, or reducing in size again. Apart from a single one, the rogue wave may be part of a wave packet consisting of a few rogue waves. Such rogue wave groups have been observed in nature.

Other media

Researchers at UCLA observed rogue-wave phenomena in microstructured optical fibers near the threshold of soliton supercontinuum generation, and characterized the initial conditions for generating rogue waves in any medium. Research in optics has pointed out the role played by a nonlinear structure called Peregrine soliton that may explain those waves that appear and disappear without leaving a trace.

Reported encounters 

Many of these encounters are reported only in the media, and are not examples of open-ocean rogue waves. Often, in popular culture, an endangering huge wave is loosely denoted as a "rogue wave", while the case has not been (and most often cannot be) established that the reported event is a rogue wave in the scientific sense – i.e. of a very different nature in characteristics as the surrounding waves in that sea state] and with very low probability of occurrence (according to a Gaussian process description as valid for linear wave theory).

This section lists a limited selection of notable incidents.

19th century
 Eagle Island lighthouse (1861) – Water broke the glass of the structure's east tower and flooded it, implying a wave that surmounted the  cliff and overwhelmed the  tower.

20th century
 SS Kronprinz Wilhelm, September 18, 1901 – The most modern German ocean liner of its time (winner of the Blue Riband) was damaged on its maiden voyage from Cherbourg to New York by a huge wave. The wave struck the ship head-on.
 RMS Lusitania (1910) – On the night of 10 January 1910, a  wave struck the ship over the bow, damaging the forecastle deck and smashing the bridge windows.
 Voyage of the James Caird (1916) – Sir Ernest Shackleton encountered a wave he termed "gigantic" while piloting a lifeboat from Elephant Island to South Georgia Island.
 RMS Homeric (1924) – Hit by a  wave while sailing through a hurricane off the East Coast of the United States, injuring seven people, smashing numerous windows and portholes, carrying away one of the lifeboats, and snapping chairs and other fittings from their fastenings.
  (1942) – Broadsided by a  wave and listed briefly about 52° before slowly righting.
  (1975) – Lost on Lake Superior, a Coast Guard report blamed water entry to the hatches, which gradually filled the hold, or, alternatively, errors in navigation or charting causing damage from running onto shoals.
Although more than one wave was probably involved, this remains the most likely sinking due to a freak wave.
 Esso Languedoc (1980) – A  wave washed across the deck from the stern of the French supertanker near Durban, South Africa, and was photographed by the first mate, Philippe Lijour.
 Fastnet Lighthouse – Struck by a  wave in 1985
 Queen Elizabeth 2 (1995) – Encountered a  wave in the North Atlantic, during Hurricane Luis. The master said it "came out of the darkness" and "looked like the White Cliffs of Dover." Newspaper reports at the time described the cruise liner as attempting to "surf" the near-vertical wave in order not to be sunk.

21st century
 U.S. Naval Research Laboratory ocean-floor pressure sensors detected a freak wave caused by Hurricane Ivan in the Gulf of Mexico, 2004. Their computer models also indicated that waves may have exceeded  in the eyewall.
 Aleutian Ballad, (Bering Sea, 2005) footage of what is identified as an  wave appears in an episode of Deadliest Catch. The wave strikes the ship at night and cripples the vessel, causing the boat to tip for a short period onto its side. This is one of the few video recordings of what might be a rogue wave.
 In 2006, researchers from U.S. Naval Institute theorized rogue waves may be responsible for the unexplained loss of low-flying aircraft, such as U.S. Coast Guard helicopters during search-and-rescue missions.
 MS Louis Majesty (Mediterranean Sea, March 2010) was struck by three successive  waves while crossing the Gulf of Lion on a Mediterranean cruise between Cartagena and Marseille. Two passengers were killed by flying glass when a lounge window was shattered by the second and third waves. The waves, which struck without warning, were all abnormally high in respect to the sea swell at the time of the incident.
 In 2011, the Sea Shepherd vessel MV Brigitte Bardot  was damaged by a rogue wave of 11 m (36.1 ft) while pursuing the Japanese whaling fleet off the western coast of Australia on 28 December 2011. The MV Brigitte Bardot was escorted back to Fremantle by the SSCS flagship, MY Steve Irwin. The main hull was cracked and the port side pontoon was being held together by straps. The vessel arrived at Fremantle Harbor on 5 January 2012. Both ships were followed by the ICR security vessel MV Shōnan Maru 2 at a distance of 5 nautical miles (9 km).
 In 2019, Hurricane Dorian's extratropical remnant generated a  rogue wave off the coast of Newfoundland.
 In 2022, the Viking cruise ship Viking Polaris was hit by a rogue wave on its way to Ushuaia, Argentina. One person died, four more were injured, and the ship's scheduled route to Antarctica was canceled.

Quantifying the impact of rogue waves on ships

München was a state-of-the-art cargo ship with multiple water-tight compartments and an expert crew. She was lost with all crew, and the wreck has never been found. The only evidence found was the starboard lifeboat, which was recovered from floating wreckage sometime later. The pins had been bent back from forward to aft, indicating the lifeboat hanging below it had been struck by a wave that had run from fore to aft of the ship and had torn the lifeboat from the ship. At the time of the inquiry, the existence of rogue waves was considered so statistically unlikely as to be near impossible. Consequently, the Maritime Court investigation concluded that the severe weather had somehow created an "unusual event" that had led to the sinking of the München.

In 1980, the MV Derbyshire was lost during Typhoon Orchid south of Japan, along with all of her crew. The Derbyshire was an ore-bulk oil combination carrier built in 1976. At 91,655 gross register tons, she was – and remains – the largest British ship ever to have been lost at sea. The wreck was found in June 1994. The survey team deployed a remotely operated vehicle to photograph the wreck. A private report  published in 1998 prompted the British government to reopen a formal investigation into the sinking. The investigation included a comprehensive survey by the Woods Hole Oceanographic Institution, which took 135,774 pictures of the wreck during two surveys. The formal forensic investigation concluded that the ship sank because of structural failure and absolved the crew of any responsibility. Most notably, the report determined the detailed sequence of events that led to the structural failure of the vessel. A third comprehensive analysis was subsequently done by Douglas Faulkner, professor of marine architecture and ocean engineering at the University of Glasgow. His 2001 report linked the loss of the Derbyshire with the emerging science on freak waves, concluding that the Derbyshire was almost certainly destroyed by a rogue wave.

This is in effect  of seawater (possibly a super rogue wave) flowing over the vessel. The deck cargo hatches on the Derbyshire were determined to be the key point of failure when the rogue wave washed over the ship. The forensic structural analysis of the wreck of the Derbyshire is now widely regarded as irrefutable.

In addition, fast-moving waves are now known to also exert extremely high dynamic pressure. Plunging or breaking waves are known to cause short-lived impulse pressure spikes called Gifle peaks. Evidence of failure by this mechanism was also found on the Derbyshire.

In 2004, an extreme wave was recorded impacting the Admiralty Breakwater, Alderney, in the Channel Islands. This breakwater is exposed to the Atlantic Ocean. This pressure far exceeds almost any design criteria for modern ships, and this wave would have destroyed almost any merchant vessel.

Design standards

The bulkhead and double bottom must be strong enough to allow the ship to survive flooding in hold one unless loading is restricted.

Rogue waves present considerable danger for several reasons; they are rare, unpredictable, may appear suddenly or without warning, and can impact with tremendous force. Although modern ships are designed to (typically) tolerate a breaking wave of 15 t/m2, a rogue wave can dwarf both of these figures with a breaking force far exceeding 100 t/m2. Smith has presented calculations using the International Association of Classification Societies (IACS) Common Structural Rules  for a typical bulk carrier, which are consistent.

Peter Challenor, a leading scientist in this field from the National Oceanography Centre in the United Kingdom, was quoted in Casey's book in 2010 as saying: "We don’t have that random messy theory for nonlinear waves. At all." He added, "People have been working actively on this for the past 50 years at least. We don’t even have the start of a theory."

Smith has also proposed that the dynamic force of wave impacts should be included in the structural analysis.
The Norwegian offshore standards now take into account extreme severe wave conditions and require that a 10,000-year wave does not endanger the ships' integrity. Rosenthal notes that as of 2005, rogue waves were not explicitly accounted for in Classification Society's rules for ships’ design. As an example, DNV GL, one of the world's largest international certification bodies and classification society with main expertise in technical assessment, advisory, and risk management publishes their Structure Design Load Principles which remain largely based on the Significant Wave Height, and as at January 2016, still has not included any allowance for rogue waves.

Smith observed in 2007 that the navy now believes that larger waves can occur and the possibility of extreme waves that are steeper (i.e. do not have longer wavelengths) is now recognized. The navy has not had to make any fundamental changes in ship design as a consequence of new knowledge of waves greater than 21.4 m because they build to higher standards.

The more than 50 classification societies worldwide each has different rules, although most new ships are built to the standards of the 12 members of the International Association of Classification Societies, which implemented two sets of common structural rules - one for oil tankers and one for bulk carriers, in 2006. These were later harmonised into a single set of rules.

Other uses of the term "rogue wave"
Rogue waves can occur in media other than water. They appear to be ubiquitous in nature and have also been reported in liquid helium, in quantum mechanics, in nonlinear optics, in microwave cavities, in Bose–Einstein condensate, in heat and diffusion, and in finance.

See also

 Oceanography, currents and regions
 
 
 
 
 
 
 
 

 Waves
 
 
 
 
  (and especially)

Notes

References

Further reading

External links

Extreme seas project
 Design for Ship Safety in Extreme Seas

MaxWave report and WaveAtlas
 Freak waves spotted from space, BBC News Online
 Ship-sinking monster waves revealed by ESA satellites
 MaxWave project
 Rogue Wave Workshop (2005)
 Rogue Waves 2004

Other
  – documentary on rogue wave sizes, impacts, and causes by Facts in Motion (YouTuber).
 BBC News Report on Wave Research, 21 August 2004
 The BBC's Horizon "Freak waves" first aired in November 2002
 'Giant Waves on the Open Sea', lecture by Professor Paul H Taylor at Gresham College, 13 May 2008 (available for video, audio or text download)
 TV program description
 Non-technical description of some of the causes of rogue waves
 New Scientist article 06/2001
 Freak Wave Research in Japan
 Optical Science Group, Research School of Physics and Engineering at the Australian National University
 "Rogue Giants at Sea", The New York Times, July 11, 2006
 
  Illustrations of the ways rogue waves can form – with descriptions for layman, photos and animations.
 "The Wave" – photograph of a solitary and isolated rogue wave appearing in otherwise calm ocean waters (photographer: G Foulds)
 Katherine Noyes (25 February 2016), "A new algorithm from MIT could protect ships from 'rogue waves' at sea ", CIO magazine.
 Wood, Charles, The Grand Unified Theory of Rogue Waves. Rogue waves – enigmatic giants of the sea – were thought to be caused by two different mechanisms. But a new idea that borrows from the hinterlands of probability theory has the potential to predict them all. February 5, 2020. Quanta Magazine.

Experimental physics
Oceanography
Ocean currents
Water waves
Weather hazards
 
Articles containing video clips
Fluid dynamics
Surface waves